Ted is an upcoming American comedy television series created by Seth MacFarlane, who also reprises his role as the voice of the titular character, it serves as a prequel to the films, and is the third overall installment in the Ted franchise.

Premise
Set in 1993, after the opening sequence in the first film, the series depicts the early life of a sentient teddy bear toy named Ted, as he lives with John Bennett and his family in Massachusetts.  In addition to John & Ted, the Bennett household includes John's father Matty,  his mother Susan, and his cousin, Blaire, who is living with them while attending a college nearby.

Cast
 Seth MacFarlane as Ted
 Alanna Ubach as Susan Bennett. Susan was previously portrayed by Alex Borstein in Ted, and presented as being named "Helen Bennett".
 Scott Grimes as Matty Bennett. Matty was previously portrayed by Ralph Garman in Ted, and presented as being named "Steve Bennett".
 Max Burkholder as John Bennett. John was previously portrayed by Mark Wahlberg, Colton Shires, and Bretton Manley in Ted.
 Giorgia Whigham as Blaire

Production
It was announced in June 2021 that Peacock had given a straight to series order for a prequel series to the 2012 film of the same name. In addition to serving as executive producer for the series, Seth MacFarlane reprises his role as the titular character "Ted". Due to the prequel nature of the series, film stars Mark Wahlberg and Mila Kunis are not expected to reprise their roles. In April 2022, Scott Grimes, Max Burkholder, and Giorgia Whigham joined the cast. In May 2022, Alanna Ubach rounded out the cast of the series.

Filming began in August 2022 on the Universal Studios backlot. The first season will consist of eight episodes. In November 2022, Seth McFarlane confirmed that filming had wrapped.

References

External links
 

Peacock (streaming service) original programming
Upcoming comedy television series
American comedy television series
American prequel television series
Television series set in 1993
Ted (franchise)
Live action television shows based on films
Television series created by Seth MacFarlane
Television series by Fuzzy Door Productions
Television series by Media Rights Capital
Television series by Universal Content Productions
Sentient toys in fiction
English-language television shows
Television shows set in Massachusetts